Brother Louie may refer to:

 "Brother Louie" (Hot Chocolate song), 1973, notably covered by Stories
 "Brother Louie" (Modern Talking song), 1986